Bumbuita/Muhiang Rural LLG is a local-level government (LLG) of East Sepik Province, Papua New Guinea. The Muhian language and Bumbita language, which are both Torricelli languages belonging to the Arapesh group, are spoken in this LLG.

Wards
01. Albinama 1
02. Timigir
03. Balif 1
04. Salata
05. Bonohol
06. Urita
07. Malohum
08. Kamanakor
09. Sunuhu 1
10. Mui 1
11. Utamup
12. Ilahita 1
13. Ilahita 3
14. Albinama 2
15. Ilahita 4
16. Numangu
17. Taunangas

References

Local-level governments of East Sepik Province